The 2006 Tour de France was the 93rd edition of Tour de France, one of cycling's Grand Tours. The Tour began in Strasbourg with a prologue individual time trial on 1 July and Stage 12 occurred on 14 July with a hilly stage from Bagnères-de-Luchon. The race finished on the Champs-Élysées in Paris, on 23 July.

A positive test for epitestosterone by Floyd Landis after Stage 17, however, left the results of the Tour de France in doubt, with the possibility that all of his records may be expunged, pending a hearing with the Court of Arbitration for Sport. On 20 September 2007, Landis was found guilty of doping and ordered that he forfeit his 2006 Tour de France victory, making Óscar Pereiro the official winner.

Stage 12
14 July 2006 — Luchon to Carcassonne, 

Stage 12 started in the Luchon, which held big celebrations because this was the fiftieth time that the Tour de France visited the city. The stage end location was Carcassonne and in between those cities the course featured four categorized climbs:
Col des Ares (Category 2 at 27.0 km/16.8 miles)
Côte des Pujos (Category 4 at 47.5 km/29.5 miles)
Côte du Pâl de Pailhes (Category 4 at 126.0 km/78.3 miles)
Côte du Palmiers (Category 4 at 136.0 km/84.5 miles)

There were also two intermediate sprints in Caumont (at 76.0 km/47.2 miles) and Mirepoix (162.0 km/100.7 miles).

This being the first stage after the Pyrenees, many riders were hoping to get an easy day, sitting at the back of the peloton; however, there were also a lot of riders who had lost a lot of time during those mountain stages and who knew that they were not going to get a good position in the general standings. Those riders all tried to get into the escape group which led to everyone chasing everyone for the first 100 kilometers and an extremely fast pace which caused the first riders already passing the 46-kilometre mark after just one hour. Another important fact for the large number of riders trying to escape was the fact that it was 14 July, in France known as Bastille Day. On this day the French are extra motivated as it is their national holiday, which shows in the results of the latest years with David Moncoutié winning in 2005 and Richard Virenque in 2004 on this day.

So a lot of changing situations during the first hours of this race, as there was always some team not happy with the current group of escapees. On the first climb of the day the first serious group formed, consisting of 15 riders:
Michael Albasini,
Daniele Bennati,
Sylvain Chavanel,
Damiano Cunego,
Stéphane Goubert,
Giuseppe Guerini,
George Hincapie,
Thor Hushovd,
David Millar,
David Moncoutié,
Cristian Moreni,
Óscar Pereiro,
Michael Rasmussen,
Gorka Verdugo,  and
Jens Voigt, .

This group looked to be getting away from the peloton at first, but suddenly  started working for Robbie McEwen as sprinters Bennati and Hushovd were in this group. They were working hard to keep the gap between the peloton and the group reasonable, but of course the leaders tried to stay ahead too. This led to the gap fluctuating between 45" and 1'15" for a very long time. From this group which formed after about 30 kilometres, six riders dropped as they waited for the peloton after 70 kilometres, knowing that they would not let the group go. Meanwhile, Albasini, Bennati, Goubert, Guerini, Hincapie, Millar, Moncoutié, Verdugo and Voigt pushed on. Finally they succeeded at kilometre 94. As soon as the breakaway group was caught, a new group formed which now consisted of only four riders:
Alessandro Ballan,
Óscar Freire,
Christophe Le Mével,  and
Yaroslav Popovych, .

Robbie McEwen was not happy again with Óscar Freire among this group, but when he tried to start up the chase again, almost the whole peloton was mad at him as they had been now riding at a huge pace for over 100 kilometres, just one day after a heavy mountain stage. It took him a few kilometres to settle down and give in and so the group did get away.  was now maintaining a moderate pace just to keep the riders within a reasonable distance but without wasting too much energy. Most riders were happy to catch a break and at that time it was almost sure one of the 4 leaders was going to win the stage.

Looking at the leading group, it was reasonable to think that Ballan, Le Mével or Popovych was going to attack sooner or later, as Freire is a top-class sprinter and would probably beat them all if they went to the finish line together. Yaroslav Popovych was the first to attack and immediately the French got disappointed as Christophe Le Mével dropped and never managed to come back. Alessandro Ballan however closed the gap and brought Óscar Freire back in his wheel. It was then Freire's turn to attack, but again Ballan closed the gap and now brought back Popovych. Popovych and Freire both took turns in attacking but Ballan seemed to be the strongest as he closed the gap every time. However, after a while he was also getting tired and could not respond to yet another attack by Popovych. He did not get any help from Freire in closing the gap and so Popovych won the stage. Freire knew he did not deserve the second place and left it to Ballan; however, this could cost him the green jersey in the end. Le Mével finished as fourth and in the peloton it was Tom Boonen who convincingly won the sprint for the fifth place, 4'25" behind Popovych.

As a result of this stage Floyd Landis remains in yellow and Yaroslav Popovych just moved into the top 10 at place 10. Robbie McEwen still holds a considerable lead of 25 points over Óscar Freire in the standings for the green jersey but sees Freire come 11 points closer, Daniele Bennati 3 points and Tom Boonen 1 point. Michael Rasmussen scored 12 points today for the polka dot jersey, but is still 19 points behind David de la Fuente. Next to the earlier mentioned quitters, today Agritubel also loses two riders who give up — José Alberto Martínez and Samuel Plouhinec. Daniele Bennati, who was not amongst the escaped riders but was almost constantly in the offense during the first 100 kilometres, received the combativity trophy for the day.

Stage 13
15 July 2006 — Béziers to Montélimar, 

This stage had five categorized climbs, all Category 4.  It started at Béziers and ended at Montélimar.

This stage was characterized by an early attack including six riders — Voigt, Pereiro, Chavanel, Coyot, Quinziato, and Grivko, who attacked about 20 km into the race.  As Cofidis had two riders in the lead group, Chavanel and Coyot, they decided to have Coyot wait for the peloton.

The main peloton, including Floyd Landis, did not see anyone in this group as a threat, so they allowed them to get away and stay away. The attack group of five had a lead of 30 seconds at 27 km.  They continued to increase their lead—to 3 minutes at 37 km, 6'20" at 47.5 km, and 11'05" at 61.5 km after the category-4 Cóte de Puéchabon climb. At the beginning of the third climb, the Cóte de L'Arbousset at 119.5 km, the lead was 18'50". The lead grew to 24'45" at the 146.5 mark, and to 27'10" at 172.5 km.  Pereiro had begun the stage 28'50" behind Landis. Now he was threatening Landis's yellow.

But this was intentional, because the previous mountain stages had shown that from Landis's teammates, only Axel Merckx was somewhat able to stay with Landis and help him.  Through losing the yellow jersey, the  team made sure that those teammates did not have to ride after the escaped riders every day; instead they now leave that responsibility to Pereiro's team, .

On the final climb, the Cóte de Villeneuve de Berg, youngster Grivko attacked.  Just like most times, the first attacker is not the winning rider, as the group was able to catch and pass him.  Grivko never managed to return and finished fifth.  In the final five kilometres, Voigt and Pereiro broke away from Chavanel and Quinziato, who were both expecting the other to close the gap.  Neither of them did, and the other two maintained their lead the rest of the way. In the final hundred meters, Pereiro was on Voigt's rear wheel, angling to pass him at the finish. Voigt held him off and barely won the stage.

In the peloton, the teammates of Menchov from Rabobank started increasing the pace, as they wanted Landis to remain in yellow to have his teammates work hard the next few days. After a few kilometres, however, they gave up and so the peloton finished 29'57" behind Voigt. Pereiro was rewarded for ending second and earned the yellow—one minute, 29 seconds ahead of Landis.  The peloton came in past the time limit of 29'00", but since more than 20% of all riders were involved, they were allowed to stay in the race.  Apart from the team standing, where Team CSC took the lead, all other jerseys remained with their rider, as the breakaway group had taken most points of the climbs and sprints.

Stage 14
16 July 2006 — Montélimar to Gap 

This stage had four categorized climbs— two Category 3, and two Category 2. It started at Montélimar and ended at Gap.

The categorized climbs were as follows:
 Côte du Bois-de-Salles (Category 3), 42% over 5.1 km
 Col de Peyruergue (Category 3), 4.8% over 5.5 km
 Col de Perty (Category 2), 5.1% over 8.8 km
 Col de la Sentinelle (Category 2), 5% over 5.2 km

There were also two intermediate sprints in La Bonté (at 50.0 km) and La Plaine (at 160.5 km).

After 39 kilometres, five riders broke away — Egoi Martínez, Matthias Kessler, Pierrick Fédrigo, Mario Aerts and Salvatore Commesso. Rik Verbrugghe and David Cañada joined the group later on, while Martinez dropped out.

With 39 kilometres to go, Verbrugghe, Kessler and Cañada were involved in a crash at downhill right-hander. Verbrugghe and Cañada were injured and had to abandon the race. Kessler could continue but was soon caught by the peloton. Of the remaining three riders, Aerts was dropped and caught by a peloton. The peloton was not able to catch Fédrigo and Commesso who had a sprint for a stage victory, with the Frenchman taking the glory. Christian Vande Velde attacked from the peloton late to get third place. Óscar Pereiro finished 26th and retained the yellow jersey.

Rest day 2
17 July 2006 — Gap

Stage 15
18 July 2006 — Gap to L'Alpe-d'Huez, 

This was a mountain stage with three categorized climbs: the Col d'Izoard (Highest Level) with an ascent of 7% over 14.5 km, the Col du Lautaret (Category 2) with an ascent of 4.4% over 12.1 km and Alpe d'Huez (Highest Level) with an ascent of 7.9% over 13.8 km. It started at Gap at 785 m and ended at L'Alpe-d'Huez at 1850 m.

Alpe d'Huez is one of the famous climbs that often figures on the Tour de France. Although Fränk Schleck from Luxembourg won the stage, American Floyd Landis' fourth-place finish was enough to regain the yellow jersey.

Stage 16
19 July 2006 — Bourg-d'Oisans to La Toussuire, 

This was a mountain stage with four categorized climbs: the Col du Galibier (Hors catégorie) with a 4.5% ascent over 42.8 km, the Col de la Croix-de-Fer (Hors catégorie) with a 6.9% ascent over 22.7 km, the Col du Mollard (Category 2) with a 6.8% ascent over 5.8 km, and La Toussuire (Category 1) with an ascent of 6% over 18.4 km. It began at Bourg-d'Oisans and ended at La Toussuire.

The Dane, Michael Rasmussen won the stage, and Spaniard Óscar Pereiro came in third, retaking the yellow jersey from American Floyd Landis, who came in 23rd on the day dropping to 11th overall.

Italian Daniele Bennati of the Lampre team was injured in a fall and unable to continue the race. French rider Sylvain Chavanel fell in the same descent, but continued after being examined.

Stage 17
20 July 2006 — St.-Jean-de-Maurienne to Morzine, 

This was a mountain stage with five categorized climbs: the Col des Saisies (Category 1) with an ascent of 6.4% over 14.9 km, the Col des Aravis (Category 2) with an ascent of 7.7% over 5.9 km, the Col de la Colombière (Category 1) with an ascent of 5% over 11.8 km, the Côte de Châtillon (Category 3) with an ascent of 4.9% over 5.1 km, and the Col de Joux-Plane (Highest Level) with an ascent of 8.7% over 11.7 km. It started at St.-Jean-de-Maurienne and ended at Morzine-Avoriaz.

American Floyd Landis put himself back in contention by winning the stage after a 120 km solo breakaway attack, advancing to third place overall. Spaniard Óscar Pereiro finished the stage in seventh place and now leads Carlos Sastre by only 12 seconds.

As is the case with all stage winners, Landis was tested as part of the Tour's standard doping precautions.  On 27 July 2006, one week after the stage finished, the  announced that the "A" test on Landis's urine sample had come back "positive" for banned synthetic testosterone as well as a ratio of testosterone to epitestosterone nearly three times the limit allowed by World Anti-Doping Agency rules. On 5 August 2006, the "B" test confirmed the initial findings and Landis was immediately dismissed by the Phonak team. In June 2008, the International Court of Arbitration for Sport dismissed Landis's appeal, disqualifying him from the 2006 Tour de France, and so stripping him of his win and suspending him from the sport for two years.

Stage 18
21 July 2006 — Morzine to Mâcon, 

This stage had three categorized climbs: the Côte de Châtillon-en-Michaille (Category 3) with an ascent of 3.7% over 51. km, the Col du Berthiand (Category 2) with an ascent of 6% over 4.7 km, and the Côte de Chambod (Category 4) with an ascent of 6.4 over 1.9 km. It started at Morzine and ended at Mâcon.

The Italian Matteo Tosatto gave the  team their first stage victory, after team leader Tom Boonen dropped out of the Tour in the Alps.  Tosatto's compatriot Cristian Moreni took second, while the yellow-jersey wearer Óscar Pereiro coasted along with American Floyd Landis on his tail.

Stage 19
22 July 2006 — Le Creusot to Montceau-les-Mines,  (ITT)

This was the last time trial of the 2006 Tour de France.

American Floyd Landis put all his rivals behind him in this stage and virtually sealed an unprecedented come-from-behind victory.

Stage 20
23 July 2006 — Sceaux to Paris, 

The last stage had two categorized climbs (both Category 4). It started at Sceaux-Antony and ended at Paris on the Champs-Élysées.

As expected after the time trials on Saturday, American Floyd Landis won the 2006 Tour de France, before it was taken away due to doping and handed to eventual winner Óscar Pereiro. Norwegian Thor Hushovd won the stage, edging out Australian sprint champion (and points winner) Robbie McEwen in the dash for the line. This makes Hushovd the first rider to win the first and last stage of the Tour de France in the same year since Bernard Hinault in 1982.

References 

Stage 12 To Stage 20, 2006 Tour De France
Tour de France stages